Kim Mi-young is a South Korean taekwondo practitioner. 

She won a gold medal in welterweight at the 1993 World Taekwondo Championships in New York City. She won a gold medal at the 1998 Asian Taekwondo Championships.

References

External links

Year of birth missing (living people)
Living people
South Korean female taekwondo practitioners
World Taekwondo Championships medalists
Asian Taekwondo Championships medalists
20th-century South Korean women